The MUSES Program (Mu Space Engineering Spacecraft) was a Japanese space programme consisting of:

 MUSES-A, the Hiten spacecraft.
 MUSES-B, the HALCA (Highly Advanced Laboratory for Communications and Astronomy) program.
 MUSES-C, the Hayabusa unmanned spacecraft.